Abdul Sattar Khan (born 21 December 1954) is an Indian film director and producer who has produced numerous Bollywood films including: Ek Baar Chale Aao , Tujhe Nahin Chhodunga and In India Today as director. His forthcoming film as director and producer is Atal Faisla, from his production house A.S.S Films.

Filmography

References

External links
 

Living people
Film producers from Rajasthan
1954 births
Hindi film producers